The wig-wag is the common name for the unusual solenoid mechanism used in belt-drive washing machines made by Whirlpool, Kenmore (manufactured by Whirlpool) and many others, from approximately 1950 to 1987 in the United States. It was used in belt-drive Brastemp and Consul models built in Brazil from 1959 to 1990. 

They were common in US-style top-loading vertical-axis machines, not used in European front-loading horizontal-axis machines. Horizontal-axis machines rotate the drum to both agitate the clothes during washing and to spin them dry. A multi-speed motor is used instead of clutches.

Operation
A vertical axis washing machine has two mechanisms: a central agitator for washing and a drum for spinning, both driven by the same motor and controlled independently by clutches to the belt drive.

The wig-wag is mounted atop the washing machine's transmission, where it oscillates back and forth like a railroad signaling wigwag (hence the name). When either solenoid is engaged, a rod catches and engages the transmission in the desired mode. A wig-wag is a form of servomechanism; the coils are not powerful enough to engage the belt clutch themselves, but they can move their pins within the cam bar, then the mechanical oscillation of the wig-wag provides the force to push the cam bar and engage the belt clutch. When a solenoid is de-energized, the pin drops due to gravity.

One of the wig-wag's solenoids is turned on to engage agitation during wash mode; the other solenoid is turned on to engage the spin-dry mode. The motor must be turned on before the solenoids are powered. Only one solenoid may be operated at a time. When neither solenoid is engaged, the transmission is in neutral and only the pump is operating to drain water out of the tub.

During a normal cycle, most Whirlpool-built wig-wag equipped washers will fill, start the motor, then engage the wash solenoid. Upon completion of the wash mode, the wash (agitate) solenoid will be turned off, which will allow the pump to drain the tub. After a minute or two, the timer will then engage the spin wig-wag which will cause the rotation of the tub. This is in contrast to some other top-load washing machines which start spinning and draining simultaneously. There are no pauses between cycles in these machines.

Problems with the wig-wag mechanism
There are three failures with the wig-wag mechanism. The first is that a solenoid tends to jam, often due to corrosion from operating in a damp environment or grease/dirt getting into the solenoid and preventing gravity from making the pin drop. The second common failure is peculiar to the wig-wag - since the wires which operate the solenoids are constantly being flexed by the motion of the wig-wag, they tend to break causing the wash or spin cycle not to engage. The third typical failure is a short inside a solenoid's coil, which will eventually burn out the coil itself and create a discontinuity within it.

References

Electromagnetic coils
Laundry washing equipment
Actuators